, 1207 players have been All Blacks. The "first" All Black was James Allan, which was decided by alphabetical order, while the most recent All Black is Mark Telea — #1207.

List

See also 
 List of international rugby union families

External links 
 All Blacks by playing order
 Complete list of player records at ESPN

 
New Zealand
Rugby union
players